The Ruthenian Uniate Church (Belarusian: Руская Уніяцкая Царква; Ukrainian: Руська Унійна Церква;) was a particular church of the Catholic Church in the territory of the Polish–Lithuanian Commonwealth. It was created in 1595/1596 by those clergy of the Eastern Orthodox Church who subscribed to the Union of Brest. In the process, they switched their allegiances and jurisdiction from the Ecumenical Patriarchate of Constantinople to the Holy See. It had a single metropolitan territory — the Metropolis of Kiev, Galicia and all Ruthenia. The formation of the church led to a high degree of confrontation among Ruthenians, such as the murder of the hierarch Josaphat Kuntsevych in 1623. Opponents of the union called church members "Uniates" although Catholic documents no longer use the term due to its perceived negative overtones. In 1620, these dissenters erected their own metropolis — the "Metropolis of Kiev, Galicia and all Ruthenia".

Background
Kievan Rus' is an ecclesiastical and cultural description of the eastern  Rus' lands during the high Middle Ages. The Greek and Latin equivalents of Rus' were Rosija and Ruthenia. It had been an empire rather than a nation state since it had many principalities and some non Slavic people. By the time of the Union of Brest, these names covered all the Eastern Slav peoples and lands, regardless whether they belonged politically to the Grand Duchy of Moscow, the Grand Duchy of Lithuania, the Crown of Poland or the Crown of Hungary. The Rus' accepted Christianity in its Byzantine form at the same time as the Poles accepted it in its Latin form; Lithuanians largely remained pagan to the late Middle Ages before their nobility embraced the Latin form upon the political union with the Poles. The eastward expansion of the Grand Duchy of Lithuania had been facilitated by amicable treaties and inter-marriages of the nobility when faced with the external threat of the Mongol invasion of Kievan Rus'. Ethnically, the Catholics of the Commonwealth were Poles, Germans and Lithuanians.

During the Protestant Reformation of the 16th century, both the Catholic Church in the Commonwealth and the Ruthenian Church underwent a period of decay. The Ruthenian Church was the church of a people without statehood. The Poles considered the Ruthenians as a conquered people. Over time, the Lithuanian military and political ascendancy did away with the Ruthenian autonomies. The disadvantageous political status of the Ruthenian people also affected the status of their church and undermined her capacity for reform and renewal. Furthermore, they could not expect support from the Mother Church in Constantinople or from their co-religionists in Moscow. Thus the Ruthenian church was in a weaker position than the Catholic Church in the Commonwealth.

Decay of the Ruthenian Church in the Commonwealth
Both the Catholic and the Ruthenian churches suffered from the policy of nominations to higher benefices by the King, the indifference of the nobility, and a low state of clerical education and discipline. The monarchs used nominations to bishoprics as rewards to faithful civil servants. After Metropolitan Joseph II Soltan (1509–1522), the names of the great families are missing among the nominees to the bishoprics. While the great families could have obtained the nominations had they cared, since they did not, the nominees came from the poorer gentry and from the burghers. Prelates continued to live the style of life they were used to as laymen: they took part in raids and carried on trade and money lending. The Ruthenian Church had no cathedral chapters to make up for the deficiencies of the bishops.

The level of education of the Ruthenian peasantry had been falling during the sixteenth century.<ref>Ploshchanskii, Proshloe, Volume I, p10, shows it for the Diocese of Kholm.</ref> This was one of the main reasons for ecclesiastical decay and one of the impediments to renewal. For the common people, their religion was ritualism; attendance was often limited to baptism and church burial.

Church of a conquered people
Poles regarded Ruthenians as a conquered people. As such, Ruthenians became a second rank people in society, their culture backward compared to the other ethnic groups in the Commonwealth. This delayed the church in recovering from the predations of the Reformation. While the Ruthenian nobility had equal rights with the Polish nobility, by the fifteenth century their ranks had been thinned by war and waves of emigration to the east. The Poles who took their place came to control the sejm. If the Ruthenian aristocracy wanted to profit from its equality, it had to become Catholic and Polish. Intermarriage played a great role in the assimilation of the Ruthenian aristocracy; usually the Catholic faith prevailed. As a result, few Orthodox aristocratic families were left in Galicia or Podilia. By the second half of the sixteenth century, Ruthenian nobility had little reason to feel discriminated against. They had kept their wealth, had access to the highest offices, and were socially accepted as equals with the Catholic nobility. By absorbing the Polish form of Western culture, they were also the first to be lost for the Ruthenian people. With the loss of the elite, the Ruthenian Church and people increasingly lost leadership, representation in the government, and benefactors for church sponsored programmes.

While the Catholic Church in the Commonwealth had successfully resisted the appeal of the Reformation,  the Ruthenian church continued to decay. The Ruthenian elite looked externally for aid. The Patriarch in Constantinople could send neither aid nor teachers. Protestant aid was unacceptable to many of them. They therefore turned to the Pope in the hope that he would curb the excesses of the Polish Catholics against Catholic Ruthenians. In this way, they also hoped that acceptance of the Ruthenian hierarchy into Catholic communion would also lead to acceptance of the Ruthenian elite into the political structure of the Commonwealth.

Ecclesiastical structure

Before the partitions of Poland
At the time of the negotiations for union there were eight Ruthenian bishoprics in the Commonwealth:
The Metropolis of Kiev itself which had the following suffragan dioceses and archdioceses (archeparchies):
 Archeparchy of Polotsk (located in the modern state of Belarus)
 Eparchy of Brest-Litovsk. The bishop also held the title of "Bishop of Volodymyr" in Volhynia.
 Eparchy of Lutsk and Ostroh also in the region of Volhynia. During the Great Northern War, Volhynia was occupied by Russian troops and the eparchy was converted to Orthodoxy until the troops were withdrawn.
 Eparchy of Turov and Pinsk in the region of Polesia
 Eparchy of Lviv
 Eparchy of Chełm
 Eparchy of Przemyśl and Sambir

Later, the Archeparchy of Smolensk was erected.
Carpathian Rus' did not belong to the Commonwealth.

After the partitions of Poland
Following the partitions, its successor states treated the Uniate Church differently. This is a list of eparchies that followed upon the partitions of the Polish–Lithuanian Commonwealth (1772–1795):
Within the Russian Empire
In the territory annexed by the Russian Empire, the Church was effectively dissolved; most of the   eparchies were forcibly converted to the Russian Orthodox Church.
 Archeparchy of Polotsk, Metropolitan of all Byzantine Catholics in Russia
 Eparchy of Brest
 Eparchy of Lutsk
 Eparchy of Lithuania

Within the Kingdom of Prussia
In the territory annexed by the Kingdom of Prussia, the Eparchy of Supraśl operated from 1798 to 1809. Following the Treaties of Tilsit, the territory was annexed by the Russian Empire. As a result, the Church was effectively dissolved and the eparchy was forcibly converted to the Russian Orthodox Church.
 Eparchy of Supraśl  (Previously part of the Eparchy of Volodymyr-Brest)

Within the Austrian Empire
In the territory annexed by the Austrian Empire, the Church continued to operate. It was reorganized as a Greek Catholic Church — the Metropolis of Kiev, Galicia and all Ruthenia. 
 Archeparchy of Lviv, Metropolitan of Galicia
 Eparchy of Chełm
 Eparchy of Przemyśl and Sambir

A similar situation continued in the Second Polish Republic of 1918 to 1939.  Suppressed in the Soviet Union from 1946, the Ruthenian Uniate Church survived to become the core of the Ukrainian Greek Catholic Church from 1989. Today, the  metropolis is styled the Major Archeparchy of Kyiv–Galicia.

List of metropolitan bishops
Metropolitans before the partitions of Poland
Metropolitans of Kyiv, Galicia and all Ruthenia:
 1596—1599 Michael Rohoza
 1600—1613 Hypatius Pociej
 1613—1637 Joseph Rutski
 1637—1640 Raphael Korsak
 1641—1655 Antonius Sielawa
 1666—1674 Gabriel Kolenda
 1674—1693 Cyprian Żochowski
 1694—1708 Leo Załęski
 1708—1713 George Winnicki
 1714—1729 Leo Kiszka
 1729—1746 Athanasius Szeptycki
 1748—1762 Florian Hrebnicki
 1762—1778 Philip Wołodkowicz
 1778—1779 Leo Szeptycki
 1780—1786 Jason Smogorzewski
 1787—1805 Theodosius Rostocki

Post-partition administrators in Russia
 Heraclius Lisowski
 Gregory Kochanowicz
 Josaphat Bułhak

Successor entities
There are three successor entities:
 Ukrainian Greek Catholic Church whose primate holds the title of Major archbishop. The incumbent Major archbishop (or metropolitan) of the Metropolis of Kyiv and Halych is Sviatoslav Shevchuk. 
 Belarusian Greek Catholic Church
 Russian Greek Catholic Church (affiliated with Russian Catholic Church)

Development in Ukraine and Belarus
Today, the Ruthenian Uniate Church has two ecclesiastical jurisdictions: the Ukrainian Greek Catholic Church and the Belarusian Greek Catholic Church. The Ukrainian jurisdiction operates in the following countries under a metropolitan bishop:
 Poland under the Metropolitan of the Archeparchy of Przemyśl–Warsaw
 the United States under the Metropolitan of the Archeparchy of Philadelphia 
 Canada under the Metropolitan of the Archeparchy of Winnipeg
 Brazil under the Metropolitan of the Archeparchy of São João Batista em Curitiba
It operates in the following countries as eparchies under the care of the Major Archbishop :
 Argentina as the Eparchy of Santa María del Patrocinio in Buenos Aires
 Australia, New Zealand and Oceania as the Eparchy of Saints Peter and Paul of Melbourne
 United Kingdom as the Eparchy of the Holy Family of London
 France, Belgium, Luxemburg, the Netherlands and Switzerland as the Eparchy of Saint Vladimir the Great of Paris
It operates in the following countries as an exarchate, directly responsible to the Holy See:
 Germany and Scandinavia as the Apostolic Exarchate of Germany and Scandinavia
 Italy and San Marino as the Apostolic Exarchate of Italy

Related
 Ruthenian Greek Catholic Church, Byzantine Rite church of Carpathian Ruthenians (better known as Rusyns).

Notes

References

Further reading

 
 
 
 
 
 

External links
 Uniate Churches. Encyclopedia.com
 Uniates and Greek Catholic church at the Encyclopedia of Ukraine
 Dzyuba, O. Kyiv Uniate Metropolitan Eparchy (КИЇВСЬКА УНІЙНА МИТРОПОЛІЯ)''. Encyclopedia of History of Ukraine

 
Eastern Catholicism in the Polish–Lithuanian Commonwealth
Belarusian Greek Catholic Church
History of the Ukrainian Greek Catholic Church
Russian Greek Catholic Church
History of Eastern Catholicism
Rusyn culture